The 2020 Marsh Community Series was the Australian Football League (AFL) pre-season competition played before the 2020 home and away season. It featured 18 matches across three weekends. All matches were televised live on Fox Footy as well as on the AFL Live app.

Results

References

Marsh Community Series
Australian Football League pre-season competition